River of Renewal: Myth and History in the Klamath Basin is a 2006 book by Stephen Most detailing the challenges in balancing economic and ecological concerns in the Klamath Basin region of the United States. The book shows clashes between federal and state government agencies, American Indian tribes, hydroelectric dam operators, and the farming and commercial fishery industries, detailing challenges and controversies around the irrigation of farmland and the preservation of the wild salmon population.

The book also traces the history of the Klamath Basin, including the Yurok, Hupa, and Karuk tribal populations, the secessionist State of Jefferson movement, and regional Bigfoot legends.

2008 film 
It was adapted into a 2008 non-fiction film, River of Renewal, that received the Best Documentary Award at the American Indian Film Festival. The film was also broadcast on PBS.

References

External links

River of Renewal film website

2006 non-fiction books
2006 in the environment
Environmental non-fiction books
Environment of California
Natural history of Del Norte County, California
Natural history of Humboldt County, California
Natural history of Modoc County, California
Natural history of Siskiyou County, California
Natural history of Trinity County, California
Environment of Oregon
Jackson County, Oregon
Klamath County, Oregon
Lake County, Oregon
Klamath River